Al-Samra was a Palestinian Arab village in the Tiberias Subdistrict. It was depopulated on April 21, 1948, during the 1947–1948 Civil War in Mandatory Palestine. It was located 10 km southeast of Tiberias.

History
The village had a mosque and several khirbas (ruined sites) including Khirbat al-Tawafiq and Khirbat Duwayraban.

Late Ottoman period
In the early 19th century, Johann Ludwig Burckhardt noted it as the only village on the eastern shore of Lake Tiberias, and that it had some ancient buildings.

In 1838, Edward Robinson was told that the village, Khurbet es-Sumrah, was on the eastern shore of the lake. The villagers were Muslim.

In 1875, Victor Guérin found here large ruins, which he misidentified as Hippos.

A population list from about 1887 showed es Samr (east shore) to have about 180 inhabitants; 20 Druze and 160 Muslims.

In 1914, an Ottoman airplane, on its way from Istanbul to Cairo, crashed by the village. Two pilots were killed. There is an Ottoman memorial to the event, about 1,5 km east of the village site. Yüzbaşı Fethi Bey, one of the first pilots of the Ottoman Air Force, was one of the pilots killed.

British Mandate period
In the 1922 census of Palestine conducted by the British Mandate authorities, the population of Samra was 157 Muslims, increasing in the 1931 census to 237; 232 Muslims and 5 Baháʼís, in a total of 50 houses.

In the 1945 statistics, Es Samra had a population of 290; 280 Muslims and 10 classified as others, with 6,912 dunams of Arab-owned land. Of this, 30 dunams were used for citrus and bananas, 21 for plantations and irrigable land, 6,828 dunams for cereals, while 23 dunams were classified as built-up area.

1948, aftermath

The village became depopulated on April 21, 1948.

HaOn was established on village land, north of the village site, in 1949.

In 1992, Walid Khalidi described the village site: "Nothing remains of the village houses. A tourist resort, which consists of a few cabins and small houses, has been established on part of the village site. Other parts of the site are covered with trees. The surrounding land is cultivated by Israelis."

References

Sources

External links
Welcome To al-Samra
al-Samra, Zochrot

Arab villages depopulated during the 1948 Arab–Israeli War
District of Tiberias